Obliq is an interpreted, object-oriented programming language designed to make distributed, and locally multithreaded, computing simpler and easier to program, while providing program safety and an implicit type system. The interpreter is written in Modula-3, and provides Obliq with full access to Modula-3's network objects abilities. A type inference algorithm for record concatenation, subtyping, and recursive types has been developed for Obliq. Further, it has been proved to be NP-complete
Obliq's syntax is very similar to Modula-3, the biggest difference being that Obliq has no need of explicit typed variables (i.e., a variable can hold any data type allowed by the type checker and if does not accepts one, i.e., a given expression execution error will display) although explicit type declarations are allowed and ignored by the interpreter. The basic data types in the language include booleans, integers, reals, characters, strings, and arrays. Obliq supports the usual set of sequential control structures (conditional, iteration, and exception handling forms), and special control forms for concurrency (mutexes and guarded statements). Further, Obliq's objects can be cloned and safely copied remotely by any machine in a distributed network object and it can be done safely and transparently.

Obliq's large standard library provides strong support for mathematical operations, input/output (I/O), persistence, thread control, graphics, and animation. Distributed computing is object-based: objects hold a state, which is local to one process. Scope of objects and other variables is purely lexical. Objects can call methods of other objects, even if those objects are on another machine on the network. Obliq objects are simply collections of named fields (similar to slots in Self and Smalltalk), and support inheritance by delegation (like Self).

The common uses of Obliq involve programming over networks, 3D animation, and distributed computing, as occurs over a local area network (LAN) such as Ethernet. Obliq is included free with the Digital Equipment Corporation (DEC) Modula-3 distribution, but other free versions exist elsewhere including precompiled binaries for several operating systems.

Projects using Obliq
The Collaborative Active Textbooks (CAT) developed using Obliq applets and the Zeus algorithm animation System (written in Modula-3).
Obliq applets (Oblets) special web browser (written in Modula-3) Obliq web page embedded applications.

References

External links

Luca Cardelli's Obliq Quick Start page (archived on 2008-10-17)

Modula programming language family
Oberon programming language family
Prototype-based programming languages
Procedural programming languages
Systems programming languages
Programming languages created in 1993
Dynamically typed programming languages